Emma Anna Maria Zimmer (née Mezel; 14 August 1888 – 20 September 1948) was a female overseer at the Lichtenburg concentration camp, the Ravensbrück concentration camp and the Auschwitz-Birkenau extermination/concentration camp for several years during the Second World War.

Mezel was born in Haßmersheim in Baden-Württemberg and was the eldest child of Oscar Mezel (a pharmacist) and his wife Maria née Lang.  In 1938, she became a guard at the Lichtenburg early concentration camp, where she became assistant camp leader under Johanna Langefeld. In 1939, she was assigned to the Ravensbrück concentration camp, where she served as assistant chief leader, and in October 1942, she became assistant camp leader at Auschwitz II (Birkenau) as an SS-Stellvertretende Oberaufseherin.

On 1 June 1943, one month before her 55th birthday, she was granted permission to stay on staff as a female overseer at Ravensbrück, despite her age. She was one of the first chief woman officers at Ravensbrück from 1939 to 1941, and took an active part in the selection of internees to be gassed during 1941 at the Bernburg Euthanasia Centre near Berlin. Zimmer served as a guard at Ravensbrück, and was known in the camp for being brutal and sadistic in her guard duties. At Auschwitz, she was particularly feared: "Our supervisor was an old and mean SS-woman called Emma Zimmer. She was vicious and dangerous and frightening us constantly with threats, proclaiming in a sadistic voice, "I will report you and then you will go away, you know where? Just one way-up the chimney." We hated her and were scared of her."

She was awarded the War Merit Cross Second Class without swords. Zimmer stood trial at the seventh Ravensbrück Trial and was sentenced to death for her war crimes. She was hanged by Albert Pierrepoint on the gallows at Hamelin Prison on 20 September 1948; she was 60 years old.

See also
 Female guards in Nazi concentration camps

Further reading

References

1888 births
1948 deaths
People from Baden-Württemberg
Holocaust perpetrators in Germany
Executed German women
Hamburg Ravensbrück trials executions
Executed people from Baden-Württemberg
Female guards in Nazi concentration camps

Executed mass murderers